The 1938 Pittsburgh Pirates season was the 57th season of the Pittsburgh Pirates franchise and their 52nd in the National League. The Pirates maintained a seven-game lead in the NL on September 1, but went 12–16–1 for the rest of the season and relinquished the lead to the Chicago Cubs on September 28, losing to the Cubs on Gabby Hartnett's "Homer in the Gloamin'". The Pirates finished second in the league with an 86–64 record.

Offseason 
 February 22, 1938: Tommy Thevenow was signed as a free agent by the Pirates.

Regular season

Season standings

Record vs. opponents

Game log

|- bgcolor="ccffcc"
| 1 || April 19 || @ Cardinals || 4–3 || Klinger (1–0) || Weiland || — || 19,865 || 1–0
|- bgcolor="ccffcc"
| 2 || April 20 || @ Cardinals || 9–4 || Tobin (1–0) || Johnson || — || 1,957 || 2–0
|- bgcolor="ccffcc"
| 3 || April 21 || @ Cardinals || 6–5 || Brown (1–0) || Bush || — || — || 3–0
|- bgcolor="ccffcc"
| 4 || April 22 || Reds || 7–4 || Lucas (1–0) || Vander Meer || Bauers (1) || 20,500 || 4–0
|- bgcolor="ccffcc"
| 5 || April 23 || Reds || 6–2 || Blanton (1–0) || Schott || — || — || 5–0
|- bgcolor="ccffcc"
| 6 || April 24 || Reds || 2–1 || Tobin (2–0) || Davis || — || 16,012 || 6–0
|- bgcolor="ccffcc"
| 7 || April 25 || Cubs || 8–6 || Brown (2–0) || Logan || — || 9,235 || 7–0
|- bgcolor="ffbbbb"
| 8 || April 26 || Cubs || 3–5 (10) || Carleton || Swift (0–1) || — || 7,523 || 7–1
|- bgcolor="ccffcc"
| 9 || April 27 || Cubs || 6–5 || Brown (3–0) || French || Klinger (1) || 9,537 || 8–1
|- bgcolor="ffbbbb"
| 10 || April 28 || Cardinals || 3–5 || Weiland || Tobin (2–1) || McGee || 8,033 || 8–2
|- bgcolor="ffbbbb"
| 11 || April 30 || @ Reds || 0–2 || Davis || Bauers (0–1) || — || — || 8–3
|-

|- bgcolor="ffbbbb"
| 12 || May 1 || @ Reds || 1–4 || Hollingsworth || Swift (0–2) || Schott || 14,439 || 8–4
|- bgcolor="ffbbbb"
| 13 || May 2 || @ Reds || 6–8 || Vander Meer || Blanton (1–1) || Benge || — || 8–5
|- bgcolor="ffbbbb"
| 14 || May 3 || Dodgers || 2–7 || Pressnell || Tobin (2–2) || — || 2,266 || 8–6
|- bgcolor="ccffcc"
| 15 || May 4 || Dodgers || 9–5 || Bowman (1–0) || Posedel || — || 2,431 || 9–6
|- bgcolor="ccffcc"
| 16 || May 5 || Dodgers || 4–2 || Lucas (2–0) || Hoyt || — || 2,031 || 10–6
|- bgcolor="ffbbbb"
| 17 || May 6 || Giants || 7–11 || Melton || Brown (3–1) || Coffman || 10,648 || 10–7
|- bgcolor="ffbbbb"
| 18 || May 7 || Giants || 5–6 || Brown || Bowman (1–1) || — || 16,064 || 10–8
|- bgcolor="ccffcc"
| 19 || May 8 || Bees || 2–1 (12) || Brown (4–1) || Fette || — || 7,512 || 11–8
|- bgcolor="ffbbbb"
| 20 || May 9 || Bees || 5–7 (10) || Hutchinson || Brandt (0–1) || Shoffner || 1,219 || 11–9
|- bgcolor="ccffcc"
| 21 || May 13 || @ Cubs || 4–1 (10) || Brown (5–1) || French || — || — || 12–9
|- bgcolor="ccffcc"
| 22 || May 15 || @ Cubs || 4–3 (11) || Swift (1–2) || Root || — || 15,494 || 13–9
|- bgcolor="ffbbbb"
| 23 || May 17 || @ Bees || 0–1 || Shoffner || Bauers (0–2) || — || 2,800 || 13–10
|- bgcolor="ffbbbb"
| 24 || May 18 || @ Bees || 1–2 (14) || Turner || Brown (5–2) || — || 2,070 || 13–11
|- bgcolor="ffbbbb"
| 25 || May 19 || @ Bees || 3–4 (11) || Hutchinson || Sewell (0–1) || — || 2,359 || 13–12
|- bgcolor="ffbbbb"
| 26 || May 20 || @ Dodgers || 5–7 || Mungo || Lucas (2–1) || Pressnell || 4,749 || 13–13
|- bgcolor="ccffcc"
| 27 || May 21 || @ Dodgers || 5–4 || Tobin (3–2) || Hamlin || — || 14,610 || 14–13
|- bgcolor="ffbbbb"
| 28 || May 22 || @ Giants || 2–18 || Hubbell || Brandt (0–2) || — || 30,343 || 14–14
|- bgcolor="ccffcc"
| 29 || May 23 || @ Giants || 4–3 || Brown (6–2) || Gumbert || Bauers (2) || 5,364 || 15–14
|- bgcolor="ffbbbb"
| 30 || May 25 || @ Phillies || 1–2 || Walters || Tobin (3–3) || — || 1,000 || 15–15
|- bgcolor="ffbbbb"
| 31 || May 27 || Cubs || 0–5 || Lee || Klinger (1–1) || — || 3,010 || 15–16
|- bgcolor="ffbbbb"
| 32 || May 28 || Cubs || 3–9 || Bryant || Bauers (0–3) || — || 4,014 || 15–17
|- bgcolor="ccffcc"
| 33 || May 29 || Cubs || 2–1 || Lucas (3–1) || French || — || 7,050 || 16–17
|- bgcolor="ccffcc"
| 34 || May 30 || Cardinals || 5–4 (17) || Klinger (2–1) || McGee || — || — || 17–17
|- bgcolor="ffbbbb"
| 35 || May 30 || Cardinals || 6–9 || Davis || Bowman (1–2) || — || 20,000 || 17–18
|-

|- bgcolor="ccffcc"
| 36 || June 1 || Giants || 4–1 || Bauers (1–3) || Melton || — || 4,001 || 18–18
|- bgcolor="ccffcc"
| 37 || June 3 || Giants || 6–5 || Klinger (3–1) || Gumbert || — || 8,513 || 19–18
|- bgcolor="ccffcc"
| 38 || June 4 || Dodgers || 4–3 (11) || Swift (2–2) || Pressnell || — || 4,168 || 20–18
|- bgcolor="ffbbbb"
| 39 || June 5 || Dodgers || 5–10 || Posedel || Bowman (1–3) || Tamulis || 6,800 || 20–19
|- bgcolor="ffbbbb"
| 40 || June 6 || Dodgers || 4–9 || Butcher || Lucas (3–2) || — || 1,594 || 20–20
|- bgcolor="ccffcc"
| 41 || June 8 || Bees || 4–1 || Klinger (4–1) || Fette || — || 2,765 || 21–20
|- bgcolor="ccffcc"
| 42 || June 9 || Bees || 5–3 || Brown (7–2) || Turner || — || 4,410 || 22–20
|- bgcolor="ffbbbb"
| 43 || June 10 || Phillies || 2–3 || Mulcahy || Bauers (1–4) || — || 1,034 || 22–21
|- bgcolor="ccffcc"
| 44 || June 11 || Phillies || 4–3 || Swift (3–2) || Walters || — || 3,811 || 23–21
|- bgcolor="ccffcc"
| 45 || June 12 || Phillies || 11–5 || Brown (8–2) || Passeau || — || 4,826 || 24–21
|- bgcolor="ffbbbb"
| 46 || June 14 || @ Giants || 3–5 || Schumacher || Bauers (1–5) || — || 5,334 || 24–22
|- bgcolor="ccffcc"
| 47 || June 15 || @ Giants || 2–0 || Tobin (4–3) || Melton || — || 5,874 || 25–22
|- bgcolor="ccffcc"
| 48 || June 16 || @ Giants || 10–2 || Klinger (5–1) || Hubbell || — || 6,880 || 26–22
|- bgcolor="ccffcc"
| 49 || June 17 || @ Phillies || 4–3 (10) || Brown (9–2) || Hollingsworth || — || 4,000 || 27–22
|- bgcolor="ffbbbb"
| 50 || June 18 || @ Phillies || 3–5 || Mulcahy || Bauers (1–6) || Passeau || — || 27–23
|- bgcolor="ccffcc"
| 51 || June 19 || @ Phillies || 14–4 || Tobin (5–3) || Sivess || — || — || 28–23
|- bgcolor="ccffcc"
| 52 || June 19 || @ Phillies || 16–3 || Blanton (2–1) || LaMaster || — || 10,000 || 29–23
|- bgcolor="ccffcc"
| 53 || June 21 || @ Dodgers || 9–3 || Bauers (2–6) || Tamulis || — || 25,527 || 30–23
|- bgcolor="ffbbbb"
| 54 || June 23 || @ Dodgers || 1–8 || Pressnell || Swift (3–3) || — || 3,258 || 30–24
|- bgcolor="ccffcc"
| 55 || June 25 || @ Bees || 8–7 || Brown (10–2) || Hutchinson || Bauers (3) || 5,614 || 31–24
|- bgcolor="ffbbbb"
| 56 || June 28 || Reds || 2–5 || Vander Meer || Bauers (2–7) || — || — || 31–25
|- bgcolor="ccffcc"
| 57 || June 29 || Reds || 5–4 || Swift (4–3) || Cascarella || — || 3,470 || 32–25
|- bgcolor="ccffcc"
| 58 || June 30 || Reds || 3–1 || Blanton (3–1) || Walters || — || 3,685 || 33–25
|-

|- bgcolor="ccffcc"
| 59 || July 2 || Cardinals || 5–1 || Klinger (6–1) || McGee || — || 3,892 || 34–25
|- bgcolor="ccffcc"
| 60 || July 3 || Cardinals || 6–5 (12) || Brown (11–2) || Shoun || — || — || 35–25
|- bgcolor="ccffcc"
| 61 || July 3 || Cardinals || 6–2 (8) || Bauers (3–7) || Henshaw || — || 20,000 || 36–25
|- bgcolor="ccffcc"
| 62 || July 4 || @ Reds || 2–1 || Blanton (4–1) || Davis || — || — || 37–25
|- bgcolor="ccffcc"
| 63 || July 4 || @ Reds || 3–2 || Swift (5–3) || Walters || — || 22,400 || 38–25
|- bgcolor="ccffcc"
| 64 || July 8 || @ Cardinals || 6–2 || Klinger (7–1) || McGee || — || — || 39–25
|- bgcolor="ccffcc"
| 65 || July 9 || @ Cardinals || 8–7 || Brown (12–2) || Lanier || — || 2,859 || 40–25
|- bgcolor="ccffcc"
| 66 || July 10 || @ Cardinals || 5–2 || Blanton (5–1) || Macon || — || — || 41–25
|- bgcolor="ccffcc"
| 67 || July 10 || @ Cardinals || 4–3 || Bauers (4–7) || Weiland || Bowman (1) || — || 42–25
|- bgcolor="ccffcc"
| 68 || July 11 || @ Cubs || 5–3 || Tobin (6–3) || French || Brown (1) || — || 43–25
|- bgcolor="ccffcc"
| 69 || July 12 || @ Cubs || 14–6 || Brandt (1–2) || Carleton || Sewell (1) || — || 44–25
|- bgcolor="ffbbbb"
| 70 || July 13 || Dodgers || 5–10 || Pressnell || Brown (12–3) || — || 5,561 || 44–26
|- bgcolor="ccffcc"
| 71 || July 14 || Dodgers || 3–2 (11) || Tobin (7–3) || Fitzsimmons || — || 7,802 || 45–26
|- bgcolor="ffbbbb"
| 72 || July 15 || Dodgers || 4–9 || Hamlin || Swift (5–4) || — || 4,512 || 45–27
|- bgcolor="ccffcc"
| 73 || July 16 || Giants || 7–3 || Klinger (8–1) || Melton || — || 15,197 || 46–27
|- bgcolor="ffbbbb"
| 74 || July 17 || Giants || 1–2 || Hubbell || Tobin (7–4) || — || — || 46–28
|- bgcolor="ffffff"
| 75 || July 17 || Giants || 7–7 ||  ||  || — || 43,241 || 46–28
|- bgcolor="ccffcc"
| 76 || July 18 || Giants || 7–4 || Blanton (6–1) || Gumbert || Swift (1) || 8,638 || 47–28
|- bgcolor="ccffcc"
| 77 || July 19 || Phillies || 8–0 || Brandt (2–2) || Mulcahy || — || 2,472 || 48–28
|- bgcolor="ffbbbb"
| 78 || July 20 || Phillies || 0–11 || Hollingsworth || Klinger (8–2) || — || — || 48–29
|- bgcolor="ccffcc"
| 79 || July 20 || Phillies || 4–1 || Bauers (5–7) || Sivess || — || 6,000 || 49–29
|- bgcolor="ccffcc"
| 80 || July 21 || Phillies || 5–4 || Brown (13–3) || Smith || — || 10,535 || 50–29
|- bgcolor="ccffcc"
| 81 || July 22 || Bees || 4–3 || Blanton (7–1) || Turner || — || 4,749 || 51–29
|- bgcolor="ffbbbb"
| 82 || July 23 || Bees || 2–4 || MacFayden || Bauers (5–8) || Errickson || — || 51–30
|- bgcolor="ccffcc"
| 83 || July 24 || Bees || 5–4 (15) || Tobin (8–4) || Hutchinson || — || — || 52–30
|- bgcolor="ccffcc"
| 84 || July 24 || Bees || 4–2 (6) || Brandt (3–2) || Lanning || — || — || 53–30
|- bgcolor="ffbbbb"
| 85 || July 26 || @ Phillies || 5–6 || Sivess || Brown (13–4) || — || 1,500 || 53–31
|- bgcolor="ccffcc"
| 86 || July 27 || @ Phillies || 4–2 || Bauers (6–8) || Hallahan || — || — || 54–31
|- bgcolor="ccffcc"
| 87 || July 28 || @ Phillies || 9–2 || Tobin (9–4) || Hollingsworth || — || 2,000 || 55–31
|- bgcolor="ccffcc"
| 88 || July 29 || @ Dodgers || 7–6 || Bowman (2–3) || Pressnell || Swift (2) || 2,582 || 56–31
|- bgcolor="ccffcc"
| 89 || July 30 || @ Dodgers || 9–2 || Blanton (8–1) || Tamulis || Brown (2) || 8,523 || 57–31
|- bgcolor="ffbbbb"
| 90 || July 31 || @ Dodgers || 3–4 || Posedel || Swift (5–5) || — || 27,719 || 57–32
|-

|- bgcolor="ffbbbb"
| 91 || August 2 || @ Bees || 1–3 || Lanning || Tobin (9–5) || — || 2,451 || 57–33
|- bgcolor="ccffcc"
| 92 || August 3 || @ Bees || 9–4 || Blanton (9–1) || Turner || Brown (3) || 7,844 || 58–33
|- bgcolor="ccffcc"
| 93 || August 3 || @ Bees || 5–3 || Bowman (3–3) || Reis || — || 7,844 || 59–33
|- bgcolor="ffbbbb"
| 94 || August 4 || @ Bees || 3–4 || MacFayden || Brown (13–5) || — || 1,834 || 59–34
|- bgcolor="ffbbbb"
| 95 || August 5 || @ Giants || 3–5 || Brown || Klinger (8–3) || — || 18,535 || 59–35
|- bgcolor="ccffcc"
| 96 || August 7 || @ Giants || 5–1 || Tobin (10–5) || Gumbert || — || — || 60–35
|- bgcolor="ccffcc"
| 97 || August 7 || @ Giants || 13–3 || Brandt (4–2) || Hubbell || — || 50,468 || 61–35
|- bgcolor="ccffcc"
| 98 || August 9 || Cardinals || 1–0 || Bauers (7–8) || Henshaw || — || 5,000 || 62–35
|- bgcolor="ffbbbb"
| 99 || August 10 || Cardinals || 0–5 (7) || Warneke || Klinger (8–4) || — || 14,000 || 62–36
|- bgcolor="ffbbbb"
| 100 || August 12 || Cubs || 3–9 || Lee || Tobin (10–6) || — || 14,962 || 62–37
|- bgcolor="ffbbbb"
| 101 || August 13 || Cubs || 5–11 || Dean || Blanton (9–2) || Page || 15,332 || 62–38
|- bgcolor="ccffcc"
| 102 || August 14 || Cubs || 2–0 || Bauers (8–8) || Root || Brown (4) || 24,193 || 63–38
|- bgcolor="ffbbbb"
| 103 || August 15 || Reds || 2–6 || Cascarella || Brown (13–6) || Davis || 6,143 || 63–39
|- bgcolor="ccffcc"
| 104 || August 16 || Reds || 10–0 || Blanton (10–2) || Davis || — || 6,253 || 64–39
|- bgcolor="ccffcc"
| 105 || August 17 || @ Cardinals || 4–3 (10) || Swift (6–5) || Henshaw || — || 2,725 || 65–39
|- bgcolor="ffbbbb"
| 106 || August 18 || @ Cardinals || 1–5 || Weiland || Bauers (8–9) || — || — || 65–40
|- bgcolor="ccffcc"
| 107 || August 20 || @ Cubs || 5–2 || Lucas (4–2) || Dean || Swift (3) || — || 66–40
|- bgcolor="ffbbbb"
| 108 || August 21 || @ Cubs || 4–6 || Lee || Blanton (10–3) || Russell || — || 66–41
|- bgcolor="ffbbbb"
| 109 || August 21 || @ Cubs || 1–6 || Carleton || Bauers (8–10) || — || 40,402 || 66–42
|- bgcolor="ccffcc"
| 110 || August 22 || @ Cubs || 4–2 || Tobin (11–6) || Bryant || — || — || 67–42
|- bgcolor="ffbbbb"
| 111 || August 23 || Bees || 0–6 || Lanning || Klinger (8–5) || — || 12,294 || 67–43
|- bgcolor="ccffcc"
| 112 || August 23 || Bees || 4–3 (14) || Brown (14–6) || Errickson || — || 12,294 || 68–43
|- bgcolor="ccffcc"
| 113 || August 24 || Bees || 6–2 || Bauers (9–10) || Hutchinson || — || 4,040 || 69–43
|- bgcolor="ffbbbb"
| 114 || August 25 || Phillies || 1–2 || Butcher || Blanton (10–4) || — || — || 69–44
|- bgcolor="ffbbbb"
| 115 || August 25 || Phillies || 1–2 (11) || Hallahan || Lucas (4–3) || — || 3,093 || 69–45
|- bgcolor="ffbbbb"
| 116 || August 26 || Phillies || 4–6 || Smith || Tobin (11–7) || Sivess || — || 69–46
|- bgcolor="ccffcc"
| 117 || August 27 || Phillies || 6–1 || Brandt (5–2) || Hollingsworth || — || 5,889 || 70–46
|- bgcolor="ffbbbb"
| 118 || August 28 || Dodgers || 5–8 || Pressnell || Bauers (9–11) || — || 16,045 || 70–47
|- bgcolor="ccffcc"
| 119 || August 29 || Dodgers || 10–1 || Blanton (11–4) || Posedel || — || 3,425 || 71–47
|- bgcolor="ccffcc"
| 120 || August 30 || Giants || 7–1 || Tobin (12–7) || Coffman || — || — || 72–47
|- bgcolor="ffbbbb"
| 121 || August 31 || Giants || 5–6 || Wittig || Bauers (9–12) || — || — || 72–48
|- bgcolor="ccffcc"
| 122 || August 31 || Giants || 12–3 || Lucas (5–3) || Melton || — || 43,586 || 73–48
|-

|- bgcolor="ccffcc"
| 123 || September 1 || Giants || 6–0 || Klinger (9–5) || Schumacher || — || 28,839 || 74–48
|- bgcolor="ffbbbb"
| 124 || September 2 || Cardinals || 10–11 || Weiland || Blanton (11–5) || McGee || 4,480 || 74–49
|- bgcolor="ffbbbb"
| 125 || September 3 || Cardinals || 0–6 || Macon || Tobin (12–8) || — || 7,759 || 74–50
|- bgcolor="ccffcc"
| 126 || September 4 || Cardinals || 5–3 || Bauers (10–12) || Henshaw || — || 12,187 || 75–50
|- bgcolor="ffbbbb"
| 127 || September 5 || Cubs || 0–3 || Lee || Brandt (5–3) || — || — || 75–51
|- bgcolor="ffbbbb"
| 128 || September 5 || Cubs || 3–4 || Bryant || Tobin (12–9) || — || 42,545 || 75–52
|- bgcolor="ccffcc"
| 129 || September 7 || @ Reds || 7–1 || Klinger (10–5) || Derringer || — || 8,839 || 76–52
|- bgcolor="ffbbbb"
| 130 || September 8 || @ Reds || 3–5 || Vander Meer || Blanton (11–6) || — || 29,043 || 76–53
|- bgcolor="ccffcc"
| 131 || September 10 || @ Cardinals || 14–7 || Brown (15–6) || Macon || — || 3,632 || 77–53
|- bgcolor="ffbbbb"
| 132 || September 11 || @ Cardinals || 4–6 || Dean || Bauers (10–13) || — || 15,739 || 77–54
|- bgcolor="ffbbbb"
| 133 || September 14 || @ Giants || 0–3 || Schumacher || Blanton (11–7) || — || — || 77–55
|- bgcolor="ffbbbb"
| 134 || September 14 || @ Giants || 3–10 || Gumbert || Brandt (5–4) || — || 28,185 || 77–56
|- bgcolor="ccffcc"
| 135 || September 15 || @ Giants || 7–2 || Tobin (13–9) || Melton || — || 4,978 || 78–56
|- bgcolor="ccffcc"
| 136 || September 16 || @ Bees || 7–6 (11) || Swift (7–5) || MacFayden || — || 8,296 || 79–56
|- bgcolor="ffbbbb"
| 137 || September 16 || @ Bees || 4–5 || Errickson || Bowman (3–4) || — || 8,296 || 79–57
|- bgcolor="ccffcc"
| 138 || September 17 || @ Bees || 2–1 || Klinger (11–5) || Shoffner || — || — || 80–57
|- bgcolor="ccffcc"
| 139 || September 18 || @ Phillies || 1–0 || Bauers (11–13) || Hollingsworth || — || — || 81–57
|- bgcolor="ffffff"
| 140 || September 18 || @ Phillies || 1–1 (5) ||  ||  || — || 1,500 || 81–57
|- bgcolor="ccffcc"
| 141 || September 22 || @ Dodgers || 6–0 || Tobin (14–9) || Fitzsimmons || — || — || 82–57
|- bgcolor="ccffcc"
| 142 || September 22 || @ Dodgers || 11–6 || Klinger (12–5) || Hamlin || Brown (5) || — || 83–57
|- bgcolor="ffbbbb"
| 143 || September 23 || Reds || 4–5 (12) || Walters || Brown (15–7) || — || 7,429 || 83–58
|- bgcolor="ccffcc"
| 144 || September 24 || Reds || 4–1 || Bauers (12–13) || Vander Meer || — || 11,318 || 84–58
|- bgcolor="ccffcc"
| 145 || September 25 || Reds || 5–3 || Lucas (6–3) || Derringer || Swift (4) || 27,147 || 85–58
|- bgcolor="ffbbbb"
| 146 || September 27 || @ Cubs || 1–2 || Dean || Tobin (14–10) || Lee || 42,238 || 85–59
|- bgcolor="ffbbbb"
| 147 || September 28 || @ Cubs || 5–6 || Root || Brown (15–8) || — || 34,465 || 85–60
|- bgcolor="ffbbbb"
| 148 || September 29 || @ Cubs || 1–10 || Lee || Bauers (12–14) || — || — || 85–61
|- bgcolor="ffbbbb"
| 149 || September 30 || @ Reds || 1–7 || Derringer || Tobin (14–11) || — || — || 85–62
|- bgcolor="ccffcc"
| 150 || September 30 || @ Reds || 4–2 || Bauers (13–14) || Moore || — || 8,361 || 86–62
|-

|- bgcolor="ffbbbb"
| 151 || October 1 || @ Reds || 6–9 || Weaver || Brown (15–9) || — || 6,351 || 86–63
|- bgcolor="ffbbbb"
| 152 || October 2 || @ Reds || 4–5 || Vander Meer || Tobin (14–12) || — || 14,007 || 86–64
|-

|-
| Legend:       = Win       = Loss       = TieBold = Pirates team member

Opening Day lineup

Roster

Player stats

Batting

Starters by position 
Note: Pos = Position; G = Games played; AB = At bats; H = Hits; Avg. = Batting average; HR = Home runs; RBI = Runs batted in

Other batters 
Note: G = Games played; AB = At bats; H = Hits; Avg. = Batting average; HR = Home runs; RBI = Runs batted in

Pitching

Starting pitchers 
Note: G = Games pitched; IP = Innings pitched; W = Wins; L = Losses; ERA = Earned run average; SO = Strikeouts

Other pitchers 
Note: G = Games pitched; IP = Innings pitched; W = Wins; L = Losses; ERA = Earned run average; SO = Strikeouts

Relief pitchers 
Note: G = Games pitched; W = Wins; L = Losses; SV = Saves; ERA = Earned run average; SO = Strikeouts

Farm system

LEAGUE CHAMPIONS: Carthage

Notes

References 
 1938 Pittsburgh Pirates team page at Baseball Reference
 1938 Pittsburgh Pirates Page at Baseball Almanac

Pittsburgh Pirates seasons
Pittsburgh Pirates season
Pittsburg Pir